Megasternum concinnum is a species of water scavenger beetle in the family Hydrophilidae. It is found in Africa, Europe and Northern Asia (excluding China), and North America.

References

Further reading

 
 
 
 
 

Hydrophilidae
Beetles described in 1802